ComicsOne Corp. was an American distributor of Asian Comics (manga, manhwa, and manhua), established in 1999. ComicsOne was based in Fremont, California, in the San Francisco Bay Area. ComicsOne also served as the distributor for videos and merchandise related to its licensed titles.

History
On March 25, 2005, industry website ICv2 reported that DrMaster, ComicsOne's Asian printer, took over the publication of ComicsOne's manga titles, though not the manhwa and manhua titles. It also added that ComicsOne had abandoned its website, "stopped paying its bills and has disappeared."

Manga published by ComicsOne

888
Bass Master Ranmaru
Bride of Deimos
Crayon Shin-chan
Dark Edge
Devil in the Water
Ginga Legend Weed
Goku Midnight Eye
Hamster Club
High School Girls
Infinite Ryvius
Iron Wok Jan!
Jesus
Joan
Junk Force
Karasu Tengu Kabuto
Kazan
Maico 2010
Mourning of Autumn Rain
NaNaNaNa (co-published with Infinity Studios)
Offered
Please Friends series
Please Teacher!
Please Twins!
Pretty Maniacs
Red Prowling Devil
Sarai
Sister Red
Tomie (later published by Dark Horse Comics)
Tsukihime, Lunar Legend
Wild 7
Wounded Man

Manhwa published by ComicsOne
My Sassy Girl
NOW
Red Moon

Manhua published by ComicsOne
Black Leopard
Crouching Tiger, Hidden Dragon (by Andy Seto)
Fung Wan
HERO
Legendary Couple
Mega Dragon and Tiger
Saint Legend
Shaolin Soccer
The Heaven Sword and Dragon Saber
The King of Fighters 2003
Story of the Tao
Weapons of the Gods

References

External links

http://www.comicsone.com/
ComicOne Transition to Dr.Master
ComicsOne Titles Back from DrMaster; ComicsOne Dead
Dr.Master Online Store; Saint Legend for sale

Manga distributors
Manhua distributors
Manhwa distributors
Defunct comics and manga publishing companies
Comic book publishing companies of the United States
Publishing companies established in 1999
1999 establishments in California
2005 disestablishments in California
Companies based in Fremont, California
Publishing companies based in the San Francisco Bay Area